Mycerinopsis lineata is a species of beetle in the family Cerambycidae. It was described by Gahan in 1895.

References

Apomecynini
Beetles described in 1895